Tirur Nambissan (1942-1994) was a Kathakali singer. He was born as Narayanan Nambissan at Tirur in the Malappuram district of Kerala in southern India. He started learning music at the age of seven, while attending the local boys' high school. He could, however, not continue his formal education or his musical education because of the unexpected deaths of his mother, three brothers and father, as well as the suicide of his younger sister - all this before he was 15 years old.

Masters, including N K Vasudeva Panikkar, his first teacher in classical music, realised the musical talent that the boy expressed through his light music, film songs and bhajanas, and guided him to Kerala Kalamandalam. Ending his school education, the eighth-form student started the journey to the world of Kathakali music under the guidance of Kalamandalam Neelakantan Nambisan, Sivaraman Nair, Kavungal Madhava Panikkar.

With Madambi Subramanian Namboodiri, Kalamandalam Hyderali and Kalamandalam Sankaran Embranthiri as contemporaries, he started to learn Kathakali music in Kalamandalam. Strict and powerful education (gurukulam style) from the great teachers and creative competition between the music students made them among the best students of that batch at the Kerala kalamandalam. From the second year of the course itself, each one of four-member team was able and confident enough to control a Kathakali stage including the major set. Hard punishment as well as parent-like love, advice and support from the teachers, plus their own hard work and group-sharing moulded them into something more powerful. He completed the eight-year course successfully (with first class). It was the start of a prominent Kathakali musician - Tirur Nambissan.

After completing the course, each one started to struggle to earn money. Some of them reached ashore, but Nambeesan was alone. He realised that it was his duty to keep the precious stone - Kathakali, which he got from the great ancestors, without a single scratch. He knew the terrible waves of changing attitudes in society. Still, he stood his ground. He was not ready to compromise in the Kathakali chitta. it was his stand that, the peculiar style (called as sopanasamgeetham) of music composition is sufficient and apt for the Kathakali. In another meaning, as a supporting music of a classical art, Kathakali music is in its utmost. So he was against the experiments. Even he was a lover of light music, he concentrated to Kathakali music and was careful to keep the identity of that music which is different from other music. He considered that it is meaningless to compare Kathakali music with other music. According to him, the ragas fixed for each literature is sufficient for the expression of the Kathakali characters. Changing of raga is a mask to hide the inefficiency of singer to express the bhavam in the early composed raga. He used manodharmas to empower the bhavas of characters, standing inside the real frame of Kathakali. Approval from the hearts of the Kathakali lovers is the great award to his career.

He worked as a music teacher in PreurGandhiSevasadan, international Kathakali centre New Delhi, Bombay, Unnayivariyer Smaraka Kalanilayam irinjalakkuda, Parassini Kaliyogam, peingode Kathakali promotion Society, Kerala Kalamandalam in different periods. Students of these institutions of the same period including SadanamJyothi, and Radhakrishnan, Private students poomully Vasudevan Namboodirippad, and vellinezhi Achuthan Kutty are the students of Tirur Nambissan too
He performed as ponnani (main singer) and as shakidi (helping singer) on thousands of stages in Kerala and out of Kerala. He was the main singer of the parassikkadavu muthappan kathakali yogam for a long period. He had been performing as ponnani with his classmates as the special invitees from parassini kaliyogam from second year of the kalamandalam course itself.

Nambissan died from a brain haemorrhage on 10 August 1994. He had been suffering various chronic illnesses, such as diabetes, for some time.

References

people from kerala|music
1994 deaths
1942 births
Singers from Kerala
People from Malappuram district
20th-century Indian male classical singers